Walter Ullrich (15 June 1912 – 5 July 1965) was a Czech ice hockey player. He competed in the men's tournament at the 1936 Winter Olympics.

References

External links
 

1912 births
1965 deaths
Czech ice hockey forwards
Olympic ice hockey players of Czechoslovakia
Ice hockey players at the 1936 Winter Olympics
Sportspeople from Opava
Czechoslovak ice hockey forwards